Keezha Pullanviduthi is a village in Alangudi taluk, Tamil Nadu, India.

Villages in Pudukkottai district